Craigie is a village  west of Blairgowrie, in Perth and Kinross, Scotland.  It is situated on the eastern side of Loch Clunie.

Robert Moray, the first President of the Royal Society, was the elder of two sons of Sir Mungo Moray of Craigie.

References

Villages in Perth and Kinross